Pieter Neefs may refer to:

 Pieter Neefs the Elder (c. 1578 – after 1656), Flemish painter
 Pieter Neefs the Younger (1620 – after 1675), Flemish painter